Changoleón is a Mexican TV personality, who participated in the popular TV shows Toma Libre and Incógnito, both hosted by Facundo, and his real name is Samuel González Quiroz.

Life and career

Little is known about him prior to his TV debut, except for the fact he studied psychology at UNAM and briefly worked as a teacher there. Uncomfortable with his job he left it in order to pursue a career as an artisan. After a 'family problem' he gave in to alcohol, and ended up living in the streets of Mexico City as a vagabond. He once mentioned he had children and that his mother was still alive.

He went into the public spotlight when he was discovered and featured in Toma Libre as a drunken hobo along with host, Facundo (also the host of Incógnito). He was usually shown heavily intoxicated, acting spontaneously at the many places he visited, such as markets, public squares and main avenues. During this episode of his life he enjoyed vast fame among teenagers, and was sought after in the whereabouts of Coyoacán, where he used to dwell.

Some of his adventures can be found at YouTube.
Changoleón became sober and lives in Acapulco, Guerrero, México.

See also
 David Zancai
 Andrew Martinez
 Naked Cowboy
 Leslie Cochran
 Jim Spagg

References

Mexican television personalities
Living people
Year of birth missing (living people)